An escadron, in French-speaking countries,  may refer to:

 Squadron (army)
 Squadron (aviation)
 Squadron (naval)
 In military aviation, the equivalent of a:
 Wing (military aviation unit) (in countries such as the United States) or;
 Group (military aviation unit) (in most Commonwealth air forces)